Monty Mark Patterson is a New Zealand international footballer who plays as a forward for New Zealand NRFL Division 1 club Manurewa.

Born in New Zealand, Patterson moved to England in 2013 where he played youth football for Ipswich Town.

He has represented New Zealand since debuting in the 2016 OFC Nations Cup. He has also represented New Zealand at youth level, including at the 2013 FIFA U-17 World Cup and the 2015 FIFA U-20 World Cup.

Club career

Ipswich Town
In 2013, when playing for Eastern Suburbs, Patterson had a successful trial at Ipswich Town and was subsequently offered a contract. He missed a significant amount of the 2015–16 Professional U21 Development League after breaking his leg in the first match of the season. He signed a one-year professional deal with Ipswich in July 2016. He went on to make his full senior debut on 22 August 2017, substituted on in a 2–1 EFL Cup defeat against Crystal Palace.

On 17 May 2018, it was announced Patterson was one of four players released from Ipswich.

Braintree Town (loan)
In October 2016 he joined Braintree Town of the National League on a month-long loan. He scored his first goal for the club in a win over Eastbourne Borough in the first round of the 2016–17 FA Cup. Patterson returned to Ipswich at the end of December 2016, after appearing eight times and scoring once in all competitions.

On 9 February 2017, Patterson returned to Braintree Town, this time on loan for the remainder of the 2016–17 campaign.

Wellington Phoenix (loan)
On 31 January 2018, Patterson was loaned to A-League club Wellington Phoenix until the end of the season.

OKC Energy
On 30 July 2018, Patterson signed with United Soccer League side OKC Energy. He was released by the team at the end of their 2018 season.

International career
Patterson was a member of the New Zealand under-23 squad for the 2015 Pacific Games. They were eliminated in the semifinals after their win against Vanuatu was overturned by the OFC for fielding an ineligible player, causing the side to miss qualification for the 2016 Olympics.

Patterson was first called up to the New Zealand national team for the 2016 OFC Nations Cup. He made his senior international debut in the first game of the tournament, a win over Fiji. He played the first 53 minutes of the final, New Zealand winning the title after defeating Papua New Guinea in a penalty shoot-out.

Patterson scored his first goal for New Zealand in a draw with United States on 11 October 2016.

Career statistics

Club

International

International goals
Scores and results list New Zealand's goal tally first.

Honours

Country
New Zealand
OFC Nations Cup: 2016
OFC U-17 Championship: 2013

Individual
OFC U-17 Championship Golden Ball: 2013
OFC U-17 Championship Golden Boot: 2013

See also
 List of New Zealand international footballers

References

External links
 
 
 
 Monty Patterson at NFF

1996 births
Living people
New Zealand association footballers
Association football forwards
New Zealand international footballers
New Zealand under-20 international footballers
New Zealand youth international footballers
Ipswich Town F.C. players
Braintree Town F.C. players
Wellington Phoenix FC players
OKC Energy FC players
Hønefoss BK players
National League (English football) players
New Zealand expatriate association footballers
2016 OFC Nations Cup players
2017 FIFA Confederations Cup players
Expatriate footballers in England
Expatriate footballers in Norway
New Zealand expatriate sportspeople in England
New Zealand expatriate sportspeople in Norway